Nadezhda Vadimovna Kozhevnikova (born April 7, 1949 in Moscow) is a Russian writer and journalist, and the daughter of Soviet writer Vadim Kozhevnikov.

Biography
In her youth, Kozhevnikova devoted herself to music. She studied in the musical school attached to the Moscow Conservatory. Her interest in literature, however, led her away from music. She studied at the Maxim Gorky Literature Institute.

She began her literary career as a journalist. She travelled throughout the Soviet Union on assignment, writing articles concerning the problems of the day. Her first stories were published while she was still a student. She uses a conventional realistic style. Her works deal with the lives of the urban intelligentsia.

English translations
Attorney Alexandra Tikhonovna, from Always a Woman: Stories by Soviet Women Writers, Raduga Publishers, Moscow, 1987.

References

1949 births
Russian women short story writers
Soviet short story writers
20th-century Russian short story writers
Soviet women writers
Soviet journalists
Russian journalists
Writers from Moscow
Moscow Conservatory alumni
Living people
20th-century women writers
20th-century Russian women
Maxim Gorky Literature Institute alumni